Beer Barrel Polecats is a 1946 short subject directed by Jules White starring American slapstick comedy team The Three Stooges (Moe Howard, Larry Fine and Curly Howard). It is the 88th entry in the series released by Columbia Pictures starring the comedians, who released 190 shorts for the studio between 1934 and 1959.

Plot
Unable to find any bars selling beer, the Stooges opt to become bootleggers and brew some of the stuff themselves. When all three of them try to mix the same amount of ingredients at the same time the brew explodes. Ultimately the Stooges succeed in making bottles of beer but an unassuming Curly sells a bottle at the black market price to a detective, landing the trio in jail. Curly tries to smuggle a barrel of beer in jail under his overcoat, but the barrel explodes under the heat of lights while the trio has their mugshots taken.

While in prison, the Stooges begin to plot their escape, and end up destroying the saws being used to whittle down the iron bars in their cell. A few days later, the Stooges have a run-in with a fellow convict (Joe Palma), leading them to accidentally knock the warden (Vernon Dent) out cold, and they are sent to the rock pile. While hammering away, the boys recall an old friend who is also in the clink, Percy Pomeroy (Eddie Laughton), and work together to flee the prison. They are ultimately captured, and sent to solitary confinement.

After nearly half a century later, the graying trio are finally released as senior citizens, in which Curly quips upon leaving "You know what I'm-a gonna do? I'm gonna get myself a tall, big, beautiful bottle of beer!" Upon hearing this, Moe and Larry beat up Curly and make the warden put Curly back in jail so both of them would avoid any further trouble.

Production notes
The title Beer Barrel Polecats is a pun of the song "Beer Barrel Polka". The idea of producing and selling their own beer during Prohibition was borrowed from Laurel and Hardy's 1931 film, Pardon Us.

When the Stooges drop their iron balls chained to their legs, the NBC Chimes are heard, a gag recycled from the team's 1937 short Back to the Woods.

A colorized version of this film was released in 2007 as part of the DVD collection "Hapless Half-Wits."

This short also marks the final appearance of the late Eddie Laughton, who died in 1952, the same year Curly, Duke York, and Dick Curtis all died.

Curly's illness
Beer Barrel Polecats was filmed over two days on April 25–26, 1945, several months after Curly Howard suffered a minor stroke. His resulting performances were marred by slurred speech and slower timing. DVD Talk critic Stuart Galbraith IV noted that Curly looked "notably thinner (Curly, Moe, and Larry are about the same weight in this) and inexpressive throughout, his face almost like a mask." Curly's illness prevented him from maintaining the vitality for the duration of the normal 4-5 day filming schedule. To compensate for his unavailability, director Jules White utilized footage from In the Sweet Pie and Pie and So Long Mr. Chumps, which featured a healthier and heavier Curly. However, according to threestooges.net, a possible lawsuit by comedian Harold Lloyd resulted in a hastily reworked script; this prompted the use of older footage in the film, and was not related to Curly's illness.

References

External links 
 
 
 Beer Barrel Polecats at threestooges.net

1946 films
Columbia Pictures short films
The Three Stooges films
American black-and-white films
Films directed by Jules White
1946 comedy films
1940s English-language films
1940s American films